Kids is the second studio album by Israeli singer-songwriter Noga Erez. The album was released on March 26, 2021, by City Slang.

Background 
Erez stated that she finished working on the album a year before its release, but its release was postponed due to COVID-19. The album was produced by Erez's partner, producer Ori Rousso, who also produced her previous album.

Erez described the process of creating the album, and said that "right after we finished Off the Radar and went on a tour we had some problems with the family and Ori's mother passed away. […] For a while we knew that the album would only deal with In this subject ,in the perspective that there is a mother and then there isn't; the same deep connection between parents and their children; and how generations pass on knowledge, but also issues and how this connection is important." She added that "the reason we called the Kids album was because we thought this whole album was going to be about that. But then life happened and it took us three years to finish the album, and so many different things happened during that time. We started leaning towards more topics."

Promotion

Singles 
The single from the album, "Views", featuring Rousso and Reo Cragun, was released on February 24, 2020. The second single from the album, "No News on TV", was released on June 23. It was followed by the third single, "You So Done", on August 26.  The fourth single, "End of the Road", was released on January 13, 2021. On March 9, along with the release of the album and its name and early sale on the iTunes Store, the fifth single, "Story", was released featuring Rousso.

Shows 
The album was preceded by an online streaming show, which took place on April 1 and 2, 2021. In addition, a tour supported the album in North America and Europe, from July 31, 2021, to March 8, 2022. On April 12, 2021, she appeared on "Jimmy Kimmel Live" with the song "Views".

Critical reception 

The album received mostly positive reviews. On Metacritic, the album received a weighted average score of 76 out of 100, based on 7 professional reviews.

On AllMusic, the album received a positive review, stating that the album "With Kids, Erez makes a significant leap forward from Off the Radar. Though she still sounds like an outsider, the skill she displays on these songs suggest she shouldn't be one for long."

Clash Magazine states that "[The album] is Restless and fast-paced, 'Kids' nurtures critical reflection without compromising humour and a good time. The songs are energetic and invigorating, a vocal punch right in your face."

On the Quetlus, the album received a score of 90 out of 100, saying that "you will not hear a better pop album this year. I doubt you will hear a better rap album this year."

In popular culture
The song 'In the end of the world' is used in the soundtrack of Netflix series Half Bad season 1 episode 5.

Track listing

References 

2021 albums
City Slang albums
Noga Erez albums